Membership of the State of Palestine in international organizations

Membership in international intergovernmental organizations

International conventions, treaties, and agreements

See also 

 International recognition of the State of Palestine
 Membership of Kosovo in international organizations

References 

Foreign relations of the State of Palestine
State of Palestine